The E.T.A.-Hoffmann-Theater is a theatre in Bamberg, Bavaria, Germany, named after the writer E. T. A. Hoffmann.

E. T. A. Hoffmann
Theatres in Bavaria
Theatres completed in 1802